The Ingøy radio transmitter was a longwave transmitter of the Norwegian Broadcasting Corporation with a frequency of 153 kHz and a power of 100 kW. The mast is the tallest structure in Norway and Scandinavia. There was also a previous, unrelated transmitter at Ingøya which was built in 1911 and was mainly used to communicate with mining companies operating in Svalbard until the German occupation of Norway in 1940, after which it was taken over by the Luftwaffe. That transmitter was bombed by the Germans on 6 June 1940 and by the British on 22 August 1944.

Transmissions from the Ingøy radio transmitter ended on 2 December 2019 at 12:06 AM CET.

See also
 List of masts
 List of tallest structures in Norway

References

External links
photos
diagrams
longwave
data

2000 establishments in Norway
Former radio masts and towers
Transmitter sites in Norway
Måsøy
Norkring
Towers completed in 2000